The 2022 Erovnuli Liga 2 was the sixth season under its current title and the 34th season of second-tier football in Georgia. The four-round competition began on 1 March and ended on 2 December with playoffs completed on 12 December.

Format
The winner gain automatic promotion to Erovnuli Liga, while the next two teams participate in play-offs against their top-flight rivals. 
 
After the initial 13 rounds, an extraordinary situation in late May resulted in early relegation of two clubs to the third tier. Among the remaining eight clubs the bottom two enter a play-off contest against 3rd and 4th teams of Liga 3 at the end of the season. A two-legged tie will be played at each side's home ground.  

Each team played 28 matches in this shortened season.

Team changes
The following teams have changed division since the 2021 season:

To Erovnuli Liga 2

Promoted from Liga 3

• Spaeri Tbilisi

Relegated from Erovnuli Liga

• Shukura Kobuleti

• Samtredia

From Erovnuli Liga 2

Promoted to Erovnuli Liga

• Sioni Bolnisi

• Gagra

Relegated to Liga 3

• Chikhura Sachkhere

Teams and stadiums

 
The participants of Liga 2 this season are listed below in alphabetical order.

Apart from Gareji Sagarejo and Spaeri Tbilisi, all of them have previously taken part in the main division. Among them are WIT Georgia and Samtredia, who have been the top-tier champions. 

Source

NOTE: Based on decision made by GFF Disciplinary Committee, Dinamo Zugdidi and Shevardeni-1906 were accused of match-fixing and expelled from the league with immediate effect on 22 May. For this reason all their team or individual records have been annulled from the statistics.

Personnel and kits

Managerial changes

League table

Results

Regular season

Round 1-14

Round 15-28

Results by round
In order to preserve chronological progress, postponed matches are not included in the round at which they were originally scheduled. Instead they are added to the full round played immediately afterwards.

Statistics

Top scorers
As of 2 December 2022

Source

Assists

Source

Clean sheets

Source

Hat-tricks
As of 2 December 2022

Discipline
Red cards 

As of 2 December 2022

• Merani Tbilisi – 6

• Spaeri – 5

• Merani Martvili, Gareji – 3 

Source

Promotion playoffs

Samtredia won 3–0 on aggregate.

Spaeri lost on penalties.

Relegation playoffs

WIT Georgia won 1–0 on aggregate and remained in the league.

Rustavi lost 0–2 on aggregate and suffered relegation.

References

External links
 Georgian Football Federation
 Daily sport newspaper Lelo (in Georgian)
 Soccerway

Erovnuli Liga 2 seasons
2
Georgia
Georgia